This is a partial list of films shown at the Sundance Film Festival (called the Utah/US Film Festival in its earliest years and then the U.S. Film and Video Festival before becoming Sundance).

1978 
Dates: September 6 – September 12; Theme: "American Landscapes: Cycles of Hope and Despair"; stylized as the Utah-USFilm Festival

1979 
Dates: October 26 – October 30; Theme: "Fear and Fantasy"

1981 
Dates: January 12 – January 18; Utah/U.S. Film Festival

1982 
Dates: January 17 – ?; Utah/U.S. Film Festival

John Ford Medallion: Stanley Kramer

1983 
Dates: January 17 – January 23; Utah/U.S. Film Festival

1984 
Dates: ? – ?; Utah/U.S. Film Festival

1985
Dates: ? – ?; Sundance Institute Presents the United States Film Festival

1986
Dates: January 17 – January 26; The United States Film Festival

1987
Dates: January 16 – January 25; Sundance Institute Presents the United States Film Festival

1988
Dates: January 15 – January 24; Sundance Institute Presents the United States Film Festival

1989
Dates: January 20 – January 29; United States Film Festival

1990
Dates: January 19 – January 27; Sundance United States Film Festival

1991
Dates: January 17 – January 27; Sundance Film Festival

1992
Dates: January 19 – January 27

1993
Dates: January 21 – January 31

1994
Dates: January 20 – January 30

1995
Dates: January 19 – January 29

1996
Dates: January 18 – January 28

1997
Dates: January 16 – January 26

1998
Dates: January 15 – January 25

1999
Dates: January 21 – January 31

2000
Dates: January 20 – January 30

2001
Dates: January 18 – January 28

2002
Dates: January 10 – January 20

2003
Dates: January 16 – January 26

See the 2003 Sundance Film Festival article for a full list of award winners.

2004
Dates: January 15 – January 25

See the 2004 Sundance Film Festival article for a full list of award winners.

2005
Dates: January 20 – January 30

2006
Dates: January 19 – January 29

See the 2006 Sundance Film Festival article for a full list of award winners.

2007
Dates: January 18 – January 28

See the 2007 Sundance Film Festival article for a full list of award winners. See the List of films at the 2007 Sundance Film Festival article for a full list of films shown.

2008
Dates: January 17 – January 27

See the 2008 Sundance Film Festival article for a full list of award winners. See the List of films at the 2008 Sundance Film Festival article for a full list of films shown.

2009
Dates: January 15 – January 25

See the 2009 Sundance Film Festival article for a full list of award winners. See the List of films at the 2009 Sundance Film Festival article for a full list of films shown.

2010
Dates: January 21 – January 31

See the 2010 Sundance Film Festival article for a full list of award winners. See the List of films at the 2010 Sundance Film Festival article for a full list of films shown.

2011
Dates: January 20 – January 30

See the 2011 Sundance Film Festival article for a full list of award winners. See the List of films at the 2011 Sundance Film Festival article for a full list of films shown.

2012
Dates: January 19 – January 29

See the 2012 Sundance Film Festival article for a full list of award winners.

2013
Dates: January 17 – January 27

See the 2013 Sundance Film Festival article for a full list of award winners.

2014
Dates: January 16 – January 26

See the 2014 Sundance Film Festival article for a full list of award winners. See the List of films at the 2014 Sundance Film Festival article for a full list of films shown.

2015
Dates: January 22 – February 1

See the 2015 Sundance Film Festival article for a full list of award winners. See the List of films at the 2015 Sundance Film Festival article for a full list of films shown.

2016
Dates: January 21 – January 31

See the 2016 Sundance Film Festival article for a full list of award winners.

2017
Dates: January 19 – January 29

See the 2017 Sundance Film Festival article for a full list of award winners.

2018
Dates: January 18 – January 28

See the 2018 Sundance Film Festival article for a full list of award winners.

2019
Dates: January 24 – February 3

See the 2019 Sundance Film Festival article for a full list of award winners.

2020
Dates: January 23 – February 2

See the 2020 Sundance Film Festival article for a full list of award winners.

2021
Dates: January 28 – February 3

See the 2021 Sundance Film Festival article for a full list of award winners.

2022
Dates: January 20 – January 30

See the 2022 Sundance Film Festival article for a full list of award winners.

2023
Dates: January 19 – January 29

See the 2023 Sundance Film Festival article for a full list of award winners.

References

External links
 Sundance Film Festival: Films Honored 1985-2008. Sundance Institute
35 Years of Sundance Film Festival

Sundance~